The Roman Catholic Diocese of Xinyang/Sínyang is a diocese located in the city of Xinyang in the Ecclesiastical province of Kaifeng in China.

History
 December 15, 1927: Established as the Apostolic Prefecture of Xinyangzhou 信陽州 from Apostolic Vicariate of Kaifengfu 開封府
 April 25, 1933: Promoted as Apostolic Vicariate of Xinyangzhou 信陽州
 April 11, 1946: Promoted as Diocese of Xinyang 信陽

Leadership
 Bishops of Xinyang 信陽 (Roman rite)
 Bishop Antonio Pott, S.V.D. (March 8, 1951 – 1954)
 Bishop Vitus Zhang Zuo-heng (Chang Tso-huan), S.V.D. (April 11, 1946 – November 13, 1949)
 Vicars Apostolic of Xinyangzhou 信陽州 (Roman Rite)
 Bishop Vitus Zhang Zuo-heng (Chang Tso-huan), S.V.D. (July 8, 1941 – April 11, 1946)
 Bishop Ermanno Schoppelrey, S.V.D. (December 13, 1933 – May 25, 1940)
 Prefects Apostolic of Xinyangzhou 信陽州 (Roman Rite)
 Fr. Giorgio Froewis, S.V.D. (August 1, 1928 – 1932)

References

 GCatholic.org
 Catholic Hierarchy

Roman Catholic dioceses in China
Christian organizations established in 1927
Roman Catholic dioceses and prelatures established in the 20th century
1927 establishments in China
Religion in Xinyang
Christianity in Henan